This is a list of charter schools in Greater Houston directly administered by the Texas Education Agency (TEA). This list does not include charter schools administered by local school districts such as Houston ISD and Spring Branch ISD.

List of charter schools in the city limits of Houston

PreK-12 schools

School Systems 
 Harmony Public Schools
 KIPP Texas schools in Houston
 YES Prep Public Schools

K-12 schools
 Academy of Accelerated Learning  and 
 Houston Alternative Preparatory Charter School 
 Raul Yzaguirre School for Success

3-12 schools
 Pro-Vision Academy

6-12 schools
 Alphonso Crutch Life Support Center Charter School
 YES Prep Southeast, home of the Wizards(1998)
 YES Prep North Central, home of the Trailblazers(2003)
 YES Prep Southwest, home of the Mavericks(2004)
 YES Prep East End, home of the Explorers(2006)
 YES Prep Gulfton, home of the Force(2007)
 YES Prep Bray Oaks, home of the Cavaliers(2009)
 YES Prep West, home of the Marvels(2009)
 YES Prep North Forest, home of the Legends(2010)
 YES Prep Fifth Ward, home of the Titans(2011)
 YES Prep Northside, home of the Pride(2011)
 YES Prep White Oak, home of the Owls(2013)

6-10
 YES Prep Southside, home of the Giants(2015)

6-8
 YES Prep Northbrook Middle School, home of the Knights(2012)
 YES Prep Hoffman, home of the Hornets(2013)
 YES Prep Northline, home of the Revolutionaries(2017)

6-7
 YES Prep Northwest, home of the Hawks(2018)

6
 YES Prep Hobby, home of the Aviators(2019)

9-12 schools
 Juan B. Galaviz Charter School
 YES Prep Northbrook High School, home of the Raiders(2015)
 YES Prep Eisenhower, home of the Eagles(2016)

9-10
KIPP CONNECT High School(2018)

PreK-8 schools
 Amigos Por Vida Friends For Life Charter School
 Brazos School for Inquiry & Creativity Gano Street 
 Brazos School for Inquiry & Creativity York Street 
 Diversity, Roots, and Wings Academy
 SER-Niños Charter School

K-8 schools
 Houston Gateway Academy

5-8 schools
 KIPP Academy Middle School, (Houston), home of the Bulldogs(1994)
 KIPP 3D Academy, home of the Tigers(2001)
 KIPP Spirit College Prep(2006)
 KIPP Liberation College Preparatory Middle School, home of the Eagles(2006)
 KIPP Sharpstown College Prep Middle School, home of the Phoenix(2007)
 KIPP Polaris Academy For Boys, home of the Panthers(2007)
 KIPP Intrepid Preparatory, home of the Lions(2008)
 KIPP Voyage Academy For Girls(2009)
 KIPP Courage College Prep, home of the Lions(2012)
 KIPP CONNECT Middle School(2014)
 KIPP Academy West Middle School(2015)
 KIPP Prime College Preparatory(2016)

5-7
 KIPP NEXUS Middle School, home of the Bobcats(2017)

5
 KIPP Journey Collegiate(2019)

PreK-7 schools
 Children First Academy of Houston

Secondary schools

High schools

 Crossroads Community Education Center
 Houston Can! Academy Charter School, home of the Bulldogs
 Houston Can! Academy Hobby 
 Houston Heights High School, home of the Panthers
 KIPP Houston High School, home of the Kerberos (2004)
 North Houston High School for Business
 George I. Sanchez High School, home of the Eagles  
 KIPP Sunnyside High School, home of the Senators(2010)
 KIPP Generations Collegiate, home of the Jaguars(2011)
 KIPP Northeast College Preparatory, home of the Navigators(2013)

Primary schools
PreK-6
 Brazos School for Inquiry & Creativity Rosslyn
 Sam Houston State University Charter School Brighton Academy
PreK-5
 Houston Heights Learning Academy 
 The Varnett School East 
 The Varnett School Northeast 
 The Varnett School Southwest 
 Sam Houston State University Charter School Cypress Trails
 Sam Houston State University Charter School Greengate Academy
K-5
 Meyerpark Elementary School 
 Ripley's House Charter School 
 University of Houston Charter School (closing 2021)
PreK-4
 KIPP SHINE Preparatory School(2004) 
 KIPP DREAM Preparatory School(2006)
 KIPP SHARP College Prep, home of the Kangaroos(2008)
 KIPP ZENITH Academy (2009)
 KIPP Explore Academy(2009)
 KIPP Legacy Preparatory School, home of the Trailblazers(2010)
 KIPP PEACE Elementary School(2011)
 KIPP CONNECT Primary School(2014)
 KIPP Unity Primary School(2015)

K-3rd
 KIPP Climb Academy(2016)

K-2nd
 KIPP NEXUS Primary School, home of the Bobcats(2017)
 Sam Houston State University Charter School Spring Woods

K
 KIPP Journey Primary (2019)

List of charter schools near the city of Houston

Secondary schools (outside city limits)

High schools (outside city limits)
 Richard Milburn Academy (Unincorporated Harris County)  * Richard Milburn Academy Pasadena (Unincorporated Harris County)
Sabotage credits and keep students in school for funding. McQuade controls all campuses and is under investigation from TEA for falsifying records.

6-12 schools (outside city limits)
 Yes North Central, home of the Trailblazers (2003) (Unincorporated Harris County)
 Yes Prep Southwest, home of the Mavericks (2004) 
YES Southeast, home of the Wizards (1998)

K-12 schools (outside city limits)

List of formerly-operated schools
 Bay Area Charter School (opened 1998, TEA sought closure in 2014) - In 2014 it had 758 students divided among three campuses in El Lago and League City. In a three year period to 2014 the state gave the school a failing academic ranking.
 Benji's Academy Charter School
 Girls and Boys Preparatory Academy
 Impact Charter School
 Jamie's House Charter School  (Unincorporated Harris County)
 Koinonia Community Learning Academy
 Life's Beautiful Educational Centers Inc. (closed 1999) - It operated H.O.P.E. in northeast Houston. Intended for African-American students encountering issues at traditional public schools, it was established by Sylvia L. Terry. The founder, who had campaigned for teacher's unions, was dead by 1999, and the corporation dissolved in 1999 after attempts of the four schools to become independent. Bill Outlaw of the TEA stated that he did not find any proof that the school improperly spent money. Stuart Eskenazi, using it as an example of early charter operators encountering difficulty with managing school finances, wrote in the Houston Press that "Life's Beautiful appears to have made honest accounting mistakes. Still, it demonstrates the operator's appalling lack of financial sense and savvy."
 Northwest Preparatory Academy (opened 1998, TEA sought closure in 2014) - In 2014 it had 300 students, and at the time it had two campuses. In a two year period to 2014 the state gave the school a failing academic ranking, and the state deemed its 2011 and 2013 finances substandard.
 7-12 schools
 Leader's Academy High School for Business and Academic Success (formerly Gulf Shores Academy)
 Victory Preparatory Academy (was state charter for a period)
 K-8 schools
 Medical Center Charter School - In opened in 1996, and catered to employees working in the Texas Medical Center and had the Montessori method, used until grade two. Its specialty as of 2003 was foreign languages. Medical Center Charter School was located in the Westbury area. Despite its name, the school is not located in the Texas Medical Center area. In 2014, the TEA announced that the school's performance was insufficient and that it sought to revoke its charter. By 2018, its charter had closed.

See also

 List of schools in Houston - Includes portions of Houston in Harris, Fort Bend, and Montgomery counties
 List of schools in Harris County, Texas

References

External links
  - A list of charter schools as of August 10, 2003

Public education in Houston
Houston